Mary Wiseman (born July 30, 1985) is an American actress. She is best known for starring as Sylvia Tilly in the Paramount+ science fiction drama series Star Trek: Discovery (2017–present).

Early life
Wiseman is the youngest daughter of Dorothy and Kevin Wiseman and has three older brothers. She grew up in Milford, Pennsylvania and Gaithersburg, Maryland. Wiseman attended the DC Shakespeare Theatre’s high school outreach program. She graduated from Quince Orchard High School in 2003 and later earned her BFA in Theatre Arts at Boston University. She went on to study at Juilliard School's Drama Division between 2011 and 2015, where one of her classmates was future Star Trek: Discovery cast member Mary Chieffo.

Career
Wiseman's stage roles have included Nitzan Halperin's Sow and Weep (2008, Boston University College of Fine Arts in New York), Ariel Carson's I Wanted it to Have a How & I Wanted it to Have a Verb (2011, Dixon Place) and Betsy/Lindsay in Clybourne Park (2013, Chautauqua Theater Company).

Wiseman has performed in productions and workshops of new plays in Playwrights’ theatres like PS 122, The Public, Soho Rep, and New York Theatre Workshop.

Wiseman appeared in the television series Longmire as Meg Joyce, a nurse and love interest for the character Archie "The Ferg" Ferguson.

In 2022, Wiseman's portrayal of the character Carlo from the Off-Broadway play At The Wedding garnered her a Lucille Lortel Award nomination in the category of Outstanding Lead Performer in a Play.

Personal life
In 2013, Wiseman began dating actor Noah Averbach-Katz who was her Juilliard School classmate. The couple married on February 16, 2019.

Wiseman identifies as queer, stating: "Before Noah, I dated and loved people of all genders. I never liked it when straight-presenting women dominated conversations about bisexuality/pansexuality when I was with women, so I try not to do it now, but I also don’t want it to feel like I’m hiding anything because I’m queer and proud!”

Filmography

Film

Television

Video game

References

External links

 
 

Place of birth missing (living people)
1985 births
Living people
Actresses from Maryland
American queer actresses
American stage actresses
American television actresses
Boston University College of Fine Arts alumni
Juilliard School alumni
People from Gaithersburg, Maryland
People from Milford, Pennsylvania
Queer women